Kathabeejam (The Germ of a Story) is a one-act play written by Malayalam language author Vaikom Muhammad Basheer. The play was written by Basheer in a period of few weeks and was conceived for the 16th anniversary of Samastha Kerala Sahitya Parishath. It was published as a book in May 1945 and was Basheer's only play. The protagonist of the play is a writer named Sadasivan.

References

External links
 Kathabeejam at DC Books official site

One-act plays
1945 plays
Indian plays
Works by Vaikom Muhammad Basheer
DC Books books